Paul Brindley may refer to:

 Paul Brindley (musician), bassist of The Sundays
 Paul Brindley (biologist) (born 1954), Australian parasitologist, microbiologist, and helminthologist